The Thompson site is a Fort Ancient culture archaeological site located near South Portsmouth in Greenup County, Kentucky, next to the Ohio River across from the mouth of the Scioto River. It was occupied during the Croghan Phase (1100 to 1200 CE) of the local chronology and was a contemporary of Baum Phase sites in the Scioto River valley.

See also
 Hardin Village site
 Bentley site
 Hansen site
 Ronald Watson Gravel site
 Cleek–McCabe site

References

Fort Ancient culture
Archaeological sites in Kentucky
Buildings and structures in Greenup County, Kentucky
Native American history of Kentucky